Général de division Louis, Comte Lepic (September 20, 1765 Montpellier – January 7, 1827 Andrésy) was a French cavalry commander of the French Revolutionary and Napoleonic Wars. He eventually rose to the rank of général de division and held the prestigious command of the Grenadiers à Cheval de la Garde Impériale, the senior heavy cavalry regiment of the Imperial Guard. He was made a baron in 1809 and then became a count in 1815, after which he was known as Comte Lepic.

Early career and Revolutionary Wars
Born the eleventh child in a poor family from Montpellier, Lepic joined a dragoon regiment at age 16 and benefitted from the outburst of the French Revolution, which facilitated his promotion to squadron commander (March 1793). He was at first involved in fighting against the Vendéean insurrection, before moving to the 'Army of Italy' in 1796, where he was remarked for gallantry and was wounded several times. Lepic remained in Italy until the end of 1805, when he was named colonel major of the Grenadiers à Cheval de la Garde Impériale regiment of the newly created Imperial Guard, which he would command for the rest of his military career.

Napoleonic Wars

Although he did not participate in the battle of Austerlitz, he did take part to the campaigns in Prussia and Poland in 1806–07. At the battle of Eylau, seeing his horse grenadiers lowering their heads as bullets whistled around, Lepic uttered the famous words: "Heads up, gentlemen, these are bullets, not turds !" (Haut la tête, messieurs, la mitraille ce n'est pas de la merde !). The ensuing heroic charge at the head of his horse grenadiers, where he was seriously wounded, brought him the rank of général de brigade. Seeing Lepic after the battle, Napoleon went to him and said: "I thought you had been captured, general Lepic. I was feeling deeply sorrowful about it." Lepic retorted: "Sire, you will only ever hear of my death." That evening, Lepic, who had been seriously wounded in action that day, received 50,000 francs, which he immediately distributed to his horse grenadiers. Five days later, he would be promoted to general and given an annuity of 30,000 francs.

Lepic then served in the Peninsula in 1808 but was called back to France in 1809 to serve in the newly created Armée d'Allemagne, the main French army which fought the Austrians in the War of the Fifth Coalition. During this campaign, Lepic was named baron of the Empire and was involved with his horse grenadier regiment in the battle of Wagram. He would then serve in Spain and Portugal between 1810 and 1811, before being recalled to the second Grande Armée for the Russian campaign. During the campaign, his most important action was his regiment's charge against Platov's cossacks on November 7, which repulsed the Russian attack on the Emperor's headquarters.

Lepic was promoted to général de division in February 1813, and he took part in the Saxon campaign of the War of the Sixth Coalition, where he would fight his last battles. Having retired in 1814, he was made a count by King Louis XVIII in January 1815. He subsequently rallied to Napoleon's return in the Hundred Days. He served in the battle of Waterloo, before being retired by Louis XVIII.

Legacy
The name LEPIC appears on the Arc de Triomphe in Paris.

His son was Louis-Joseph-Napoléon Lepic (1810–1875), who had a distinguished military career and was a close supporter of Napoléon III. His grandson was Ludovic-Napoléon Lepic, an artist and friend of Edgar Degas.

References

Sources
Fierro, Alfredo; Palluel-Guillard, André; Tulard, Jean - "Histoire et Dictionnaire du Consulat et de l'Empire”, Éditions Robert Laffont, 

Generals of the First French Empire
Commanders in the French Imperial Guard
1765 births
1827 deaths
Cavalry commanders
Names inscribed under the Arc de Triomphe